Elections to the Baseball Hall of Fame for 1990 followed the system in place since 1978. 
The Baseball Writers' Association of America (BBWAA) voted by mail to select from recent major league players and 
elected two, Joe Morgan and Jim Palmer. The Veterans Committee met in closed sessions to consider older major league players as well as managers, umpires, executives, and figures from the Negro leagues. It selected no one. A formal induction ceremony was held in Cooperstown, New York, on August 6, 1990; after being delayed a day due to rain, it was held indoors due to continued bad weather.

BBWAA election

The BBWAA was authorized to elect players active in 1970 or later, but not after 1984; the ballot included candidates from the 1989 ballot who received at least 5% of the vote but were not elected, along with selected players, chosen by a screening committee, whose last appearance was in 1984. All 10-year members of the BBWAA were eligible to vote.

Voters were instructed to cast votes for up to 10 candidates; any candidate receiving votes on at least 75% of the ballots would be honored with induction to the Hall. The ballot consisted of 44 players; a total of 444 ballots were cast, with 333 votes required for election. A total of 3,050 individual votes were cast, an average of 6.87 per ballot. Those candidates receiving less than 5% of the vote will not appear on future BBWAA ballots, but may eventually be considered by the Veterans Committee.

Candidates who were eligible for the first time are indicated here with a dagger (†). The two candidates who received at least 75% of the vote and was elected is indicated in bold italics; candidates who have since been elected in subsequent elections are indicated in italics. The 20 candidates who received less than 5% of the vote, thus becoming ineligible for future BBWAA consideration, are indicated with an asterisk (*).

Roy Face was on the ballot for the 15th and final time.

The newly eligible candidates included 19 All-Stars, four of whom were not on the ballot, who were selected a total of 50 times. The field included 10-time All-Star Joe Morgan, 6-time All-Star Jim Palmer, and 5-time All-Star Amos Otis. The group of new candidates include one MVP (Morgan, who won twice), one Cy Young Award winner (Palmer, who won thrice), and one Rookie of the Year (Lou Piniella).

Players eligible for the first time who were not on the ballot were: Glenn Abbott, Jerry Augustine, Tom Burgmeier, John Curtis, Jim Essian, Pete Falcone, Ron Hodges, Ron Jackson, Frank LaCorte, Jerry Martin, Milt May, Larry Milbourne, Sid Monge, Biff Pocoroba, Ron Reed, Leon Roberts, Craig Swan, Tom Underwood, Mike Vail, and Tom Veryzer.

J. G. Taylor Spink Award 
Jerome Holtzman (1926–2008) received the J. G. Taylor Spink Award honoring a baseball writer. The award was voted at the December 1989 meeting of the BBWAA, and included in the summer 1990 ceremonies.

References

External links
1990 Election at www.baseballhalloffame.org

Baseball Hall of Fame balloting
Hall of Fame balloting